The Ministry of Transport, Mobility and Urban Agenda (MITMA), traditionally known as the Ministry of Development (MFOM), is the department of the Government of Spain responsible for preparing and implementing the government policy on land, air and maritime transport infrastructure and the control, planning and regulation of the transport services on this areas. It is also responsible for guaranteeing access to housing; urban, soil and architecture policies; planning and controlling the postal and telegraph services, directing the services related to astronomy, geodesy, geophysics and mapping, and planning and programing the government investments on infrastructure and services related to this scope. The Ministry's headquarters are in the New Ministries government complex.

MITMA is headed by the Minister of Transport, Mobility and Urban Agenda, who is appointed by the King of Spain at request of the Prime Minister. The Minister is assisted by two main officials, the Secretary of State for Infrastructure, Transport and Housing and the Under Secretary of Transport, Mobility and Urban Agenda. Other senior officials of the ministry include the Secretary General for Infrastructure, the Secretary General for Transport and the Secretary General for Housing. The current Minister is Raquel Sánchez since 12 July 2021.

History

First years and new ministries 
The Ministry of Development, currently Ministry of Transport, Mobility and Urban Agenda was created in by Royal Decree of 28 January 1847. In this date, the former Secretariat of State and of the Dispatch of General Development of the Realm (created in 1812 and re-established in 1832) had a huge scope of competences and included areas of government policy that, over the years, would be splintered in the Ministries of Education, Culture, Agriculture, Development, Health, Industry and Commerce. On 13 May 1834 the ministry was renamed "of the Interior" and in December 1835 "Secretary of State and of the Dispatch of the Governance of the Realm".

Precisely, in 1847. that department split for the first time with the creation of a Secretariat of the Dispatch for Commerce, Instruction and Public Works which assumed the competences over public works, education and charity and, in 1851, officially acquired the name of Ministry of Development. Around 1869 the Ministry was composed of the Directorate-General for Public Instruction and the Directorate-General for Public Works, Agriculture, Industry and Trade. A year later the National Geographic Institute was created, which is incorporated from the first moment to this Ministry.
In 1900, the Education and Culture areas were torn apart from Development, when the Ministry of Public Instruction was created. For five years, the department was named Agriculture, Industry, Trade and Public Works, with powers over railroads, roads, canals, ports, lighthouses and beacons, as well as agriculture, industry and trade. These last three areas of activity were attributed to the new Ministry of National Economy in 1928, maintaining public works, railways, mines, forestry, fishing and hunting.

After the advent of the Second Republic, and by virtue of the Decree of 16 December 1931, the name of the Ministry of Public Works was adopted. It had an Undersecretariat and three Directorates-General: Railways, Trams and Mechanical Road Transport; Roads and Hydraulic Works and the Central Service of Ports and Maritime Signals. The structure was maintained for almost half a century, albeit with partial modifications: in 1968 the Technical General Secretariat was created; the Directorate-General for Railways, Trams and Mechanical Transport by Road was renamed Directorate-General for Land Transport and the Directorate-General for Roads and Hydraulic Works was renamed Directorate-General for Roads.

Democratic stage 
Major changes occur during the Constituent Legislature. Between July 1977 and March 1991, the competences of the original department remain divided in two: On the one hand, the Ministry of Public Works and Urbanism (with the incorporation of the competences in matter of housing and the Directorate-General for Territorial Action and Environment, coming from Office of the Prime Minister) and on the other hand, the Ministry of Transport and Communications (since 1981, also Tourism). In 1990, the environmental issue was given greater importance, with the creation of the General Secretariat for Environment.

It was not until the third government of Felipe González when the merger occurred again (except for the Tourism area), by Royal Decree 576/1991, of 21 April, with Josep Borrell as minister of the Department (who in 1993 incorporated to its denomination the term 'Environment'). With the arrival of José María Aznar to the Government, the old denomination of Ministry of Development was recovered and it is created, for the first time in Spain, a Ministry of Environment which assumed those competences.

Since then, the competencies has been practically the same with little modifications like the loss of the telecoms functions in 2000 and the loss of housing functions between 2004 and 2010.

Structure 
The Ministry of Development employs the following bodies:

 The Secretariat of State for Transport, Mobility and Urban Agenda.
 The General Secretariat for Infrastructure.
 The Directorate-General for Roads.
The Directorate-General for Planning and Evaluation of the Railway Network.
The Technical Cabinet.
 The General Secretariat for Transport and Mobility.
 The Directorate-General for Civil Aviation.
 The Directorate-General for Land Transport.
 The Directorate-General for the Merchant Marine.
The Transport Studies and Technology Division.
The Technical Cabinet.
 The General Secretariat for Urban Agenda and Housing.
 The Directorate-General for Urban Agenda and Architecture.
The Directorate-General for Housing and Soil.
The Deputy Directorate-General for Administrative Coordination and Management
The Technical Cabinet.
 The Emergency and Crisis Management and Coordination Unit.
 The Deputy Directorate-General for Planning, Trans-European Network and Logistics.
 The Deputy Directorate-General for International Relations.
The Undersecretariat.
 The Technical General Secretariat.
 The Directorate-General for Economic Programming and Budget.
 The Directorate-General for Organization and Inspection.
 The Directorate-General of the National Geographic Institute.
The Emergency and Crisis Coordination Unit.
The Special Commissioner for Transport, Mobility and Urban Agenda.
The Office of the Special Commissioner for Transport, Mobility and Urban Agenda.

Ministry agencies and enterprises 

 Ports of the State
 Railway Infrastructure Administrator
 Renfe Operadora
 ENAIRE
 Public enterprise for Soil.
 Railway Safety Agency
 Spanish Aviation Safety and Security Agency
 Maritime Safety and Rescue Society

List of Ministers
 

(1) Minister of Communications(2) Minister of Public Works(3) Minister of Public Works and Communications(4) Minister of Communications and the Merchant Navy(5) Minister of Communications, Transport and Public Works(6) Minister of Communications and Transport(7) Minister of Public Works and Urban Development(8) Minister of Public Works, Transport and the Environment(9) Minister of Development(10) Minister of Agriculture, Industry, Trade and Public Works(11) Minister of General Development of the Realm(12) Minister of Trade, Education and Public Works(13) Minister of Inner Affairs(14) Secretary of State and of the Dispatch of General Development of the Realm(15) Minister of Transports and Communications(16) Minister of Transports, Tourism and Communications(17) Minister of Transport, Mobility and Urban Agenda

Notes and references

External links
 Ministry of Public Works and Transport (Spanish)

1847 establishments in Spain
Organizations established in 1847
Public Works
Public Works
Spain
Spain
Public Works
Transport organisations based in Spain
Transport in Spain
Housing in Spain
Infrastructure in Spain